The Cafundó River, also known as the Itiúba River, is a river of Alagoas state in eastern Brazil. It is a tributary of the São Francisco River.

See also

References
Brazilian Ministry of Transport

Rivers of Alagoas